This Week is a news and current affairs radio programme broadcast on RTÉ Radio 1. It airs Sundays between 1300 and 1400. 

The programme is presented by RTE's former political correspondent David McCullagh, former Washington-based US correspondent Carole Coleman and political reporter Justin McCarthy. The programme is edited by former investigative reporter John Burke. 

The new programme team was announced by RTE on 3 September 2018, as reported in the Irish Independent and Irish Times.

The programme's previous presenters were Brian Dowling and Colm O Mongain. They departed the programme when O Mongain became the news station's Deputy Foreign Editor and Brian Downing left journalism after a long career in print and broadcasting to become Head of Editorial Standards and Compliance in RTE. 

The programme was edited and presented for many years by Gerald Barry. Other presenters in the past included the national broadcaster's former Middle East Correspondent Richard Crowley, Michael Good, Paul Maguire, Gavin Jennings and Sean O Rourke. David McCullagh previously worked on the programme in the 1990s prior to becoming a dedicated political reporter. Since 2013 the programme's reporter had been John Burke, before he was appointed editor in September 2018. 

In October 2015 the programme won two PPI awards for radio journalism. One award was for best national radio news and current affairs programme and the second award was for best national radio news presenter, for Richard Crowley. 

In June 2018, John Burke and Colm Ó Mongáin were awarded the Law Society's Justice Media Award (broadcast/radio) for an investigation and analysis into under-resourcing of GSOC, the Irish national policing investigation agency. The citation, published on the Law Society website, read: "An excellent example of detailed investigative reporting, bringing previously unpublished information to the public attention and providing incisive analysis of the difficulties involved".

Long known for its in-depth interviews, news packages and foreign coverage, This Week has more recently established a strong reputation for breaking original news stories.

Lengthened editions are also aired on the occasion of major breaking news stories such as general elections or referendums.

References

Irish talk radio shows
RTÉ News and Current Affairs
RTÉ Radio 1 programmes